Dame Katherine Christie Watt,  (31 August 1886 – 1 November 1963) was a British military nurse, nursing administrator and civil servant.

Watt served in the Queen Alexandra's Imperial Military Nursing Service during the First World War, and the Princess Mary's Royal Air Force Nursing Service in the inter-war period. She was Matron-in-Chief of the Royal Air Force Nursing Service from 1930 to 1938, and worked at the Ministry of Health during and immediately after the Second World War. As Chief Nursing Officer from 1941 to 1948, she was actively involved in the plans for the new National Health Service (NHS).

Honours
On 3 June 1930, Watt was awarded the Royal Red Cross (RRC) "in recognition of exceptional devotion and competency displayed in Royal Air Force hospitals at home and in Iraq". In the 1935 King's Birthday Honours, she was appointed a Commander of the Order of the British Empire (CBE).

In the 1945 King's Birthday Honours, she was promoted to Dame Commander of the Order of the British Empire (DBE) in recognition of her service as Chief Nursing Officer, and thereby granted the title dame. In July 1959, she was appointed a Commander of the Order of St John (CStJ).

References

 

 
 
 

1886 births
1963 deaths
Scottish nurses
Military personnel from Glasgow
Queen Alexandra's Royal Army Nursing Corps officers
Princess Mary's Royal Air Force Nursing Service officers
Dames Commander of the Order of the British Empire
Members of the Royal Red Cross
Commanders of the Order of St John
Female nurses in World War I
People from Govanhill and Crosshill
Florence Nightingale Medal recipients
NHS Chief Professional Officers